Fluorcarmoite-(BaNa) is a rare phosphate mineral, belonging to arrojadite group, with the formula Ba[]Na2Na2[]CaMg13Al(PO4)11(PO3OH)F2. It is a barium-rich member of the group, as is arrojadite-(BaNa), arrojadite-(BaFe), fluorarrojadite-(BaFe) and an unapproved species ferri-arrojadite-(BaNa). The "-(BaNa)" suffix informs about the dominance of the particular elements (here barium and sodium) at the corresponding structural sites.

Arrojadite group
The arrojadite group is defined in form of the complex, general formula A2B2CaNa2+xM13Al(PO4)11(PO3OH1−x)W2, where:
 A = large divalent cations (barium, lead, strontium) and vacancy ([]), eventually monovalent cations (potassium, sodium)
 B = small divalent cations (iron, manganese, magnesium) and vacancy ([]), eventually sodium
 M = Fe2+ (this gives the root name arrojadite) or Mn2+ (root name dickinsonite), or eventually Mg
 W = hydroxyl group or fluorine
The two suffixes in the name correspond to A1 and B1 sites. Third suffix may be present in special cases.

References

Phosphate minerals
Barium minerals
Sodium minerals
Calcium minerals
Magnesium minerals
Aluminium minerals
Fluorine minerals
Monoclinic minerals
Minerals in space group 9